Green recovery packages are proposed environmental, regulatory and fiscal reforms to build prosperity in the wake of an economic crisis, like the COVID-19 pandemic or the Global Financial Crisis. They pertain to fiscal measures that intend to recover economic growth while also positively benefitting the environment, including measures for renewable energy, efficient energy use, nature based solutions, sustainable transport, green innovation and green jobs, amongst others.

For green recovery in response to the COVID-19 pandemic, support has come from multiple political parties, governments, activists and academia across the European Union, the United Kingdom, the United States, and other countries. Following similar measures in response to the Global Financial Crisis, a key part of the packages is to ensure that actions to combat recession also combat climate change, including the reduction of coal, oil, and gas use, clean transport, renewable energy, eco-friendly buildings, and sustainable corporate or financial practices. These initiatives are supported by the United Nations and the Organisation for Economic Co-operation and Development. Several global initiatives have provided live tracking of national fiscal responses, including the Global Recovery Observatory (from Oxford University, the United Nations, and the IMF), the Energy Policy Tracker (from a consortium of six organisations), and the OECD's Green Recovery Tracker. The Global Recovery Observatory includes ~8,000 policies in 88 countries compared to ~1,700 for Energy Policy Tracker in 35 countries, and 1,500 in 44 countries for the OECD. 

Dilineating between rescue and recovery investment, an Oxford University March 2021 analysis found that 18% of recovery investment and 2.5% of total spending had been green. In July 2021, the International Energy Agency supported that analysis, noting that only around 2% of economic bailout money worldwide was going to clean energy. According to a 2022 analysis of the $14tn that G20 countries have spent as economic stimulus, only about 6% of pandemic recovery spending has been allocated to areas that will also cut greenhouse-gas emissions, including electrifying vehicles, making buildings more energy efficient and installing renewables.

Background
Since the industrial revolution, the burning of coal, oil and gas has released millions of tons of carbon dioxide, methane, and other greenhouse gases into the atmosphere, causing global warming. By 2020, the Earth's average temperature had risen by over 1 °C since pre-industrial levels. The United Nations Intergovernmental Panel on Climate Change calculated that continuing to burn fossil fuels will heat the planet by between 0.8 degrees to 2.5 degrees per 1000 gigatons of burning carbon and that 2900 gigatons of carbon remain in proven reserves. Burning a fraction of fossil fuel reserves will therefore lead to dangerous planetary heating, resulting in widespread crop failures, and the 6th mass extinction event.

By the end of 2019, increasing incidents of wild fires in Australia, the Amazon rainforest in Brazil, and the Arctic forests in Russia had been reported, as well as increased risks of hurricanes in the United States and Caribbean, and flooding. In 2015, most countries signed the Paris Agreement committing to limit global carbon emissions to prevent temperature rises by over 2 degrees, with an ambition to limit temperature rise to 1.5 degrees. Activists and politicians, particularly younger people, demanded a "Green New Deal" in the US, a Green Industrial Revolution in the UK, to end the use of fossil fuels in transport, energy generation, agriculture, buildings, and finance. In late 2019, the EU announced a European Green Deal, although this was said to fall far short of the goal of ending fossil fuel use in the bloc by 2050.

In early 2020, the COVID-19 pandemic caused countries to lock down their economies, in an attempt to prevent infections and deaths. This required many businesses to suspend work, as people travelled less, shopped less, and stayed at home to work more. In most countries this caused job losses. The fall in economic activity also caused a fall in greenhouse gas emissions. This drove groups to call for, and politicians and governments to promise, a green recovery. 

In earlier discourses, the positive side effects of green policies have been termed co-benefits. According to the IPCC, co-benefits are "the positive effects that a policy or measure aimed at one objective might have on other objectives, irrespective of the net effect on overall social welfare". Renewable energies can boost employment and industrial development. Depending on the country and the deployment scenario, replacing coal power plants with renewable energy can more than double the number of jobs per average MW capacity (albeit, this represents a concomitant 50% productivity loss). Besides economic effects, climate mitigation strategies can provide health-related co-benefits. Solar mini-grids can improve electricity access for rural areas and the replacement of coal-based energy with renewables can lower the number of premature deaths caused by air pollution.

Green recovery proposals
Proposals for a green recovery vary widely.

In the United States, a group of academics and activists introduced "a green stimulus to rebuild our economy" in March 2020. The menu of policies targeted eight fields, housing and civic infrastructure, transportation, labour and green manufacturing, energy generation, food and agriculture, environment and green infrastructure, innovation policy, and foreign policy. Its requested funding level was set at 4% of the US GDP, or around $850 billion a year, until the dual achievement of full decarbonisation and an unemployment rate below 3.5%.

In the UK, the government proposed "a green and resilient recovery," and announced £3 billion in funding for building renovations in July. By contrast, in early July, an academic and think tank group proposed a "Green Recovery Act" that targeted nine fields: transport, energy generation, agriculture, fossil fuels, local government, international agreement, finance and corporate governance, employment, and investment. This established duties on all public bodies and regulators to end use of fossil fuels "as fast as technologically practicable," with strict exceptions if absent technical alternatives.

In June 2020, the German government pledged a green recovery with funding of €40 billion (£36 billion or US$45 billion) as part of a €130 billion recovery package.

In July 2020, the European Council agreed to a recovery fund of €750 billion, branded Next Generation EU (NGEU). An overall climate target of 30% will apply to the total amount of expenditure from the NGEU in compliance with the Paris climate agreement.

In February 2021, commentators such as the Council on Foreign Relations noted that other major economies such as China, India, and the European Union had begun "implementing some of the policies envisioned by the Green New Deal."

Over spring 2021, US President Biden introduced his American Jobs Plan and American Families Plan, which incorporated green recovery principles including investments in carbon capture and storage, clean energy, and a Civilian Climate Corps similar to the Depression-era Civilian Conservation Corps. Progressives criticised the plans as not ambitious enough.

A July 2021 update to the World Scientists' Warning to Humanity found the 17% of COVID-19 recovery investments funds that had reportedly been allocated to a green recovery as of March 2021 to be insufficient. They warned that climate policies should be part of COVID-19 recovery. They demanded that plans address root causes and that immediate, drastic reductions in greenhouse gases be prioritised.

According to a 2021 analysis by the Overseas Development Institute, China could do more to support a green recovery in developing countries.

Digital technologies are important in achieving the green transition and the European Green Deal's environmental targets. Emerging digital technologies, if correctly applied, have the potential to play a critical role in addressing environmental issues. Smart city mobility, precision agriculture, sustainable supply chains, environmental monitoring, and catastrophe prediction are just a few examples.

Digitally advanced companies put more money into energy-saving strategies. In the European Union, 59% of companies that have made investments in both basic and advanced technologies have also invested in energy efficiency measures, compared to only 50% of US firms in the same category. Overall, there is a significant disparity between businesses' digital profiles and investments in energy efficiency.

Economics 

Economic growth has been a key driver of CO2 emissions. Economic growth may also drive technological change and increase energy efficiency. Economic growth typically requires investment. Investment in energy-intensive sectors, specifically carbon energy sources, can strengthen the link between economic growth and emissions. If the investment is in clean energy the relationship can be the reverse. Investment in less energy-related sectors, such as the services sector, then the link may be tenuous. 

The "environmental Kuznets curve" (EKC) hypothesis posits that at early stages of development, pollution per capita and GDP per capita move in the same direction. Beyond a certain income level, emissions per capita decrease as GDP per capita increases, thus generating a U-shaped relationship between GDP per capita and pollution. One study concluded that the econometrics literature did not support either an optimistic or a pessimistic interpretation of the hypothesis. Instead, it suggested some degree of flexibility between economic growth and emissions growth.

Emissions pricing 
A government can specify a price of greenhouse gas emissions, and use that number to set tax rates for businesses and possibly households. Carbon taxes are considered especially useful because the tax revenues pay for government spending while lowering GHG emissions. It is almost a consensus among economists that carbon taxes are the lowest cost method of reducing emissions. Few countries have implemented such taxes, given pushback from the public and industry. The tax is typically regressive.

Liberalization and restructuring of energy markets has occurred in several countries and regions, including Africa, the EU, Latin America, and the US. These policies have mainly been designed to increase market competition, but they can have a significant impact on emissions. Reform could allow the market to be more responsive to price signals placed on emissions. In 2020 it was estimated that by 2022 replacement of all existing coal-fired power stations by renewables and storage would be profitable in total but that "A key barrier to accelerating phaseout is that the vast majority (93 percent) of global coal plants are insulated from competition from renewables by long-term contracts and noncompetitive tariffs".

See also

European Green Deal
Green economy
Green growth
Green New Deal
 Impact of the COVID-19 pandemic on the environment
Just transition
Politics of climate change
Timeline of sustainable energy research 2020–present

Notes

References
 
 
 
 

Climate change policy
Low-carbon economy
Coal phase-out
Sustainable energy
Responses to the COVID-19 pandemic
2020s in the environment